Henry Seymour Lansing was an American Brevet Brigadier General who commanded the 17th New York Infantry Regiment during some of the deadliest battles of the American Civil War as well as commanding the 3rd Brigade of the 1st Division of the V Corps.

Biography

Early years
Henry was born at Utica, New York as the son of Barent Bleecker Lansing and Sarah Breese Lansing Platt as well as the brother of Henry Livingston Lansing. Prior to the war, Lansing was a key participant of the establishment of the Military Association of New York.

American Civil War
Lansing initially was assigned to the 12th New York Infantry Regiment as a captain. He was then assigned to organize the 17th New York Infantry Regiment on May 29, 1861 for a three year tenure. Lansing would fight at the Siege of Yorktown as well as the Seven Days Battles but was wounded during the Seven Days Battles and had to be taken to a hospital. On October 17, the 17th New York became part of the Army of the Potomac and Lansing was the commander of the 3rd Brigade of the 1st Division of the V Corps. Lansing would then participate at the battles of 2nd Bull Run, Antietam, Frederickburg and Chancellorsville. Lansing was then honorably discharged on June 2, 1863 due to the lack of strength he had anymore.

Post-War years
After the war, he was brevetted to Brigadier General on March 13, 1865 for "faithful and meritorious services during the war". Lansing then worked for the American European Express and spent several years in Paris as their representative and on 1876, was a auditor of the Philadelphia Centennial. He was then mustered into George Meade's position as the No. I Position of the Department of Pennsylvania on January 29, 1879. Lansing died on April 13, 1882 and was buried at St. Mary's Episcopal Church, Burlington, New Jersey.

References

1824 births
1882 deaths
Union Army generals
Military personnel from Utica, New York
Union Army colonels
People of New York (state) in the American Civil War